The Teesside Lions  are an English basketball club from the town of Middlesbrough in the northeast of England. The Lions compete in National Basketball League Division 3, and play their home games at Eston Sports Academy.

History

Founded in 2007 as the Middlesbrough Lions, the organisation made an early impact on the national scene, entering the National League after strong performances in the National Founders Cup, an annual knockout competition for non-league clubs. The club participated in the National League from 2010 to 2013, before dropping back down into the regional league as the newly named Teesside Lions. The Lions announced plans to re-enter National League Division 3 for the 2019–20 season.

In January 2019, the club announced plans to bring professional basketball to the area.

Season-by-season records

References

External links
Official Teesside Lions website
England Basketball website

Basketball teams in England
Sport in Middlesbrough